Reinforcement is a consequence that will strengthen an organism's future behavior whenever that behavior is preceded by a specific antecedent stimulus.

Reinforcement may also refer to:
 Reinforcement (speciation)
 Reinforcement bar or rebar, a steel bar or mesh of steel wires used as a tension device
 Reinforcement learning, an area of machine learning inspired by behaviorist psychology

See also
 Stiffening